Buffelsdraai is a township in eThekwini in the KwaZulu-Natal province of South Africa.

References

Populated places in eThekwini Metropolitan Municipality